The Tonga Chronicle, also known as Kalonikali Tonga, was  a state-owned weekly newspaper in Tonga. It was established in 1964 and until 2009, published both in the English as well as the Tongan language. 

In March 2009, due to poor returns as a state-owned enterprise, the Government of Tonga agreed to hand over management of the Tonga Chronicle to Taimi Media Network and publisher Kalafi Moala, for a three-year period. The staff of the Times of Tonga newspaper moved in to share the state-owned building and assets of the Tonga Chronicle, which then began printing in English only, heavily reducing circulation and cutting staff numbers.

There had been problems in operation of the paper, which was occasionally withdrawn to publish fortnightly, monthly and ceased publication for periods. In May 2011, Taimi Media Network owner and CEO Kalafi Moala finally decided to cease publication of the paper indefinitely. On 20 March 2012, as the management contract ended, "the Tonga Chronicle and its assets [were] returned to the government".

The agreement between Kalafi Moala and the government of Tonga was that he would operate the newspaper and turn it profitable, whilst utilizing the assets of the Chronicle for the publication of his own Tongan newspaper, Taimi 'o Tonga.

The current managing editor is former editor of the Taimi 'o Tonga, Faka'osi Maama.

Two other government enterprises whose management was outsourced by the Tongan government in 2009, along with the Tonga Chronicle, was the Tonga National Cultural Centre, to Vava'u Member of Parliament 'Etuate Lavulavu; and the Queen Salote Memorial Hall, to Simote Po'uliva'ati, former manager of International Dateline Hotel.

Articles of the newspaper were also published in the 'Taimi 'o Tonga alternate website'''.

Previous editors of the newspaper include Paua Manu'atu (Tu'isoso)(USA), Pilimisolo Tamo'ua(Tonga), Muhammad Ali Afu(AUST), Mateaki Heimuli(RIP) then outsource to Taimi Media Network and editors; Kalafi Moala, Josephine Latu-Sanft and Tevita Motulalo.

As of March 2009, The Tonga Chronicle'' became Tonga's only solely English Language Newspaper.

References

Newspapers published in Tonga
Publications established in 1964
1960s establishments in Tonga